Mysore Shrinivas Sathyu (born 6 July 1930) is a leading film director, stage designer and art director from India. He is best known for his directorial Garm Hava (1973), which was based on the partition of India. He was awarded Padma Shri in 1975.

Early and personal life
Born into a Kannada Brahmin family, Sathyu grew up in Mysore. He pursued his higher education at Mysore and later Bangalore. In 1952, he quit college while working on his Bachelor of Science degree.

Sathyu is married to Shama Zaidi, a north Indian Shia Muslim. They have two daughters.

Career
He freelanced as an animator in 1952–53. After being unemployed for nearly four years, he got his first salaried job as assistant director to filmmaker Chetan Anand.

He worked in theatre as a designer and director, including designing sets and lights for productions of Hindustani Theatre, Okhla Theatre of Habib Tanvir, Kannada Bharati and other groups of Delhi. In films, he has worked as an art director, camera-man, screenwriter, producer and director. His first film. His fas an independent Art director  or Haqeeqat, a film by Chetan Anand, which won him recognition and the 1965 Filmfare Award for Best Art Direction.

His filmography includes over 15 documentaries and 8 feature films in Hindi, Urdu and Kannada.

His best known work, Garm Hava (Scorching Winds, 1973), is one of the last cinema productions featuring 1950s Marxist cultural activists including Balraj Sahni and Kaifi Azmi. Garm Hava won several Indian national awards in 1974, including a National Integration Award. It was screened in the competitive section at Cannes and was also the Indian entry at the Oscars. It won the Filmfare award for best screenplay.

M. S. Sathyu currently is associated mainly with television and stage. In 2013, Sathyu featured in the popular Google Reunion ad, where he played the role of Yusuf, an elderly Pakistani man who is reunited with his childhood pre-partition friend from India, Baldev (Vishwa Mohan Badola). The commercial went viral on social media.

Sathyu is one of the patrons of Indian People's Theatre Association (IPTA).

He directed musical  play Gul E Bakavali written by Sudheer Attavar; represented 8th World Theatre Olympics in year 2018 . He also directed plays like 'Dara Shikoh', Amrita,Bakri, Kuri,Akhri Shama and many more

In 2014, his debut film, Garm Hava was re-released after restoration.

Awards
 1965 : Filmfare Best Art Direction Award: Haqeeqat (for black-and-white film category)
 1974 : Cannes Film Festival: Golden Palm : Garm Hava: Nominated.
 1974 : National Film Award: Nargis Dutt Award for Best Feature Film on National Integration: Garam Hawa
 1975 :  Padma Shri
 1981-82 : Karnataka State Film Award for First Best Film for "Bara"
 1981-82 : Karnataka State Film Award for Best Director for "Bara"
 1982 : Filmfare Award for Best Film – Kannada for "Bara"
 1982 : Filmfare Award for Best Director – Kannada for "Bara"
 1984 : National Film Award: Nargis Dutt Award for Best Feature Film on National Integration: Sookha 
  1984 : Filmfare Critics Award for Best Movie Hindi : Sookha
 1994 : Sangeet Natak Akademi Award: Stagecraft
 2014 :Sangeet Natak Akademi Fellowship : Theatre

Production

Theatre plays
 Gul E Bakavali musical Play written by Sudheer Attavar
 Dara Shikoh written by Danish Iqbal
 Mudrarkshas
 Aakhri Shama
 Rashmon
 Bakri ("Kuri" in Kannada)
 Girija Ke sapne
 Mote Ram Ke Sathyagrah
 Emil's Enemies
 Amrita :

Films

Feature Films

Ek Tha Chotu Ek Tha Motu
Garm Hawa (Hot Wind) 1973
Chithegu Chinthe 1978 - Screened at 7th IFFI.
Kanneshwara Rama (The Legendary Outlaw)
 Kahan Kahan Se Guzar Gaya (1981)
Bara (Famine), based on a short story by U.R. Anantha Murthy (1982)
 Sookha Hindi version of the Kannada movie Bara (1983)
Ghalige (Kannada)
Kotta (1999)
Ijjodu ( Kannada) 2009

Short films and Documentaries

Irshad
Black Mountain
Ghalib
Islam in India

Television

TV serials

Pratidhwani 1985
Choli Daaman 1987–88
Kayar (Coir) 1992
Antim Raja (The Last Raja of Coorg) 1986

Tele-films

Aangan
Ek Hadsa Char Pehlu
Thangam

Television and YouTube Advertisements

Reunion, an advertisement for Google Search

References

External links

 

Living people
Indian art directors
Hindi-language film directors
Indian television directors
Kannada film directors
Artists from Mysore
Indian theatre directors
Recipients of the Padma Shri in arts
Recipients of the Sangeet Natak Akademi Award
Filmfare Awards winners
Indian scenic designers
Filmfare Awards South winners
20th-century Indian designers
Screenwriters from Karnataka
20th-century Indian film directors
Film directors from Karnataka
Film producers from Karnataka
21st-century Indian film directors
Producers who won the Best Film on National Integration National Film Award
Directors who won the Best Film on National Integration National Film Award
1930 births
Recipients of the Sangeet Natak Akademi Fellowship